Mount Coates may refer to:

 Mount Coates (Mac. Robertson Land)
 Mount Coates (Victoria Land)